Eldar Salayev (31 December 1933 – 20 June 2022) was an Azerbaijani physician. He was President of the Azerbaijan National Academy of Sciences from 1983 to 1997.

Biography
From 1970 to 1973, Salayev was Deputy Director of Scientific Affairs at the Institute of Physics Azerbaijan National Academy of Sciences.

Eldar Salayev died on 20 June 2022 at the age of 88.

References

1933 births
2022 deaths
Azerbaijani physicians
Soviet physicists
Baku State University alumni
People from Nakhchivan
Recipients of the Order of the Red Banner of Labour
Recipients of the Shohrat Order